Centennial Tower is a highrise building in Midland, Texas. It is the third-tallest building in the city after the Bank of America Building and the Wilco Building.

See also 
 List of tallest buildings in Midland, Texas

References

Skyscraper office buildings in Midland, Texas

Office buildings completed in 1979